Daniel Auer (born 26 October 1994) is an Austrian cyclist, who currently rides for UCI Continental team .

Major results
2016
 1st Stage 1 Peace Race U23
 3rd Poreč Trophy
 4th GP Laguna
2017
 1st Stage 1 Le Triptyque des Monts et Châteaux
2018
 1st GP Kranj
 2nd GP Izola
 7th Umag Trophy
2019
 3rd  Road race, European Games
2021
 1st  Mountains classification Belgrade–Banja Luka
1st Stage 3 
 1st Stage 3 Giro del Friuli-Venezia Giulia
 2nd Overall Tour of Szeklerland
1st Stage 4 
 8th Poreč Trophy
2022
 1st Umag Trophy
 1st GP Slovenian Istria

References

External links

1994 births
Living people
Austrian male cyclists
Cyclists at the 2019 European Games
European Games medalists in cycling
European Games bronze medalists for Austria
21st-century Austrian people